The Super League Dream Team is an annually-selected rugby league All Star Team consisting of the players deemed to have been the best in their respective positions in the Super League competition. The team is selected by a panel of journalists and broadcasters at the end of each season.

The inaugural Dream Team was selected in 1996, the competition's first season. The team is traditionally selected following the completion of the regular season, and so does not take play-off matches into account.

1996

 † indicates that year's Man of Steel.

1997

 † indicates that year's Man of Steel.

1998

 † indicates that year's Man of Steel.

1999

 † indicates that year's Man of Steel.

2000

 † indicates that year's Man of Steel.

2001

 † indicates that year's Man of Steel.

2002

 † indicates that year's Man of Steel.

2003

 † indicates that year's Man of Steel.

2004

 † indicates that year's Man of Steel.

2005

 † indicates that year's Man of Steel.

2006

 † indicates that year's Man of Steel.

2007

 † indicates that year's Man of Steel.

2008

 † indicates that year's Man of Steel.

2009

The 2009 Super League Dream Team was announced on 14 September 2009.

 † indicates that year's Man of Steel.

2010
On 6 September 2010, the Dream Team of Super League XV was announced. The team boasted four players from league leaders Wigan Warriors; including first appearances for Pat Richards, Sean O'Loughlin and Joel Tomkins, with the latter's brother Sam appearing for the second successive year. Three players came from second and third placed St. Helens and Warrington Wolves; those being Paul Wellens, James Roby and James Graham (St Helens) and Matt King, Adrian Morley ad Ben Westwood (Warrington). Two players, left wing partnership Keith Senior and Ryan Hall, were selected from Leeds Rhinos, and the team was completed by Michael Dobson of Hull Kingston Rovers. Only three of the thirteen (Richards, King and Dobson) in 2010 were imports, one of whom (Richards) had switched his allegiance to Ireland in 2008. 2010 also proved to be the first time a set of brothers (the Tomkins') have appeared in the same Dream Team.

 † indicates that year's Man of Steel.

2011

 † indicates that year's Man of Steel.

2012
On 10 September 2012, the Dream Team for Super League XVII was announced. The team consisted of six players from league leaders Wigan Warriors, three from league runners-up Warrington Wolves, two from Catalans Dragons and one each from St Helens R.F.C. and Super League XVI winners Leeds Rhinos. Six players (Ryan Atkins, Rémi Casty, Josh Charnley, Brett Finch, Chris Hill and Gareth Hock) make their debuts in the Dream Team, while three players (James Roby, Sam Tomkins and Ben Westwood) have been selected for the fourth time with Tomkins being selected four years in a row.

 † indicates that year's Man of Steel.

2013
On 9 September 2013, the Super League XVIII Dream Team was announced at Huddersfield's John Smith's Stadium. The team was virtually made up of English players with Danny Brough who now represents Scotland at international level, although was born in Dewsbury in West Yorkshire. Brough was also one of five Huddersfield Giants players in the Dream Team, which acknowledges the club winning the League Leaders' Shield. The other Huddersfield players being Eorl Crabtree, Leroy Cudjoe, Brett Ferres and Shaun Lunt.

Wigan Warriors have four players, three of which, Josh Charnley, Sean O'Loughlin and Sam Tomkins, being the only members of the 2012 Dream Team to be selected in 2013 with Tomkins now selected in the Dream Team five years in a row. The other Wigan player selected was Matty Smith

The remainder of the Dream Team consists of two players from Hull F.C. (Ben Crooks and Tom Lineham) and one each from Leeds Rhinos (Jamie Peacock) and Wakefield Trinity Wildcats (Danny Kirmond), who are the only team to have a player in the Dream Team but not involved in the play-offs. Despite finishing second in the table, no players from Warrington Wolves were selected.

 † indicates that year's Man of Steel.

2014
The first Dream Team to be made up of entirely English players. This is the first time since 2010 that Sam Tomkins does not make an appearance and a debut for Zak Hardaker, Tommy Makinson, Michael Shenton, Kallum Watkins, Kevin Brown, Daryl Clark and Carl Ablett. Jamie Peacock makes a record tenth appearance.

 † indicates that year's Man of Steel.

2015 
Jamie Peacock made a record and 11th and final appearance.

 † indicates that year's Man of Steel.

2016 
The 2016 Dream Team featured nine players making their first appearance.

 † indicates that year's Man of Steel.

2017 
The 2017 Dream Team featured eight players making their first appearance. Six players selected from League Leaders Castleford Tigers.

2018 
The 2018 Dream Team featured eight players making their first appearance. Seven players selected from League Leaders St Helens.

 † indicates that year's Man of Steel.

2019 
The 2019 Dream Team featured nine players making their first appearance. League Leaders and Champions St Helens had the most players for any one team with five

 † indicates that year's Man of Steel.

2020 
The 2020 season was shortened due to the COVID-19 pandemic. The team was selected based on the Man of Steel points totals. St Helens had the most players of any team with three as players from eight different clubs were chosen.

 † indicates that year's Man of Steel.

2021 
Second place St Helens and League Leaders Catalans Dragons dominate this years dream team with 5 and 4 selections respectively. Sam Tomkins returns after an 8 year absence, Hull K.R. have their first representative in a decade and Liam Farrell, Alex Walmsley and Johnny Lomax all retain their places from last year.

 † indicates that year's Man of Steel.

2022 
The 2022 Super League dream team was dominated by the North West clubs with League Leaders St Helens having 4 players, as well as 2nd placed Wigan and 6th placed Salford having 3 players each. Six players make their first appearance whilst Ken Sio, Jack Welsby, Alex Walmsley, Liam Farrell, and Morgan Knowles retain their places from last year. Bevan French makes his first appearance since 2020 and James Roby makes his first appearance since 2018.

 † indicates that year's Man of Steel.

Appearances by club and country 
To date, 17 different clubs have seen players appear in the Dream Team.

14 different countries have seen players appear in the Dream Team. Fiji are the latest country to see a player appear with Kevin Naiqama making the team in 2019 for St. Helens.

Players who have made at least five appearances

See also

References

External links
2009 Super League Dream Team at superleague.co.uk
2008 Super League Dream Team at superleague.co.uk
2007 Super League Dream Team at news.bbc.co.uk
2006 Super League Dream Team at news.bbc.co.uk
2005 Super League Dream Team at news.bbc.co.uk
2004 Super League Dream Team at news.bbc.co.uk
2003 Super League Dream Team at news.bbc.co.uk
2002 Super League Dream Team at news.bbc.co.uk
2001 Super League Dream Team at news.bbc.co.uk
2000 Super League Dream Team at news.bbc.co.uk

Dream Team
Rugby league trophies and awards